Damaragidda panchayat village in Narayanpet district, Telangana. The village of Damaragidda is the only village in the gram panchayat. The mandal is in the Narayanpet Assembly Constituency and Mahabubnagar Loksabha Constituency.

Demographics
In the 2001 census Damaragidda Mandal had a population of 49,221.

References

Villages in Narayanpet district